Charles Wyndham Standing (23 August 1880 – 1 February 1963) was an English film actor.

Early years 
Standing was born in London, England and died in Los Angeles, California. He was the son of veteran actor Herbert Standing and the brother of actors Sir Guy Standing, Jack Standing, Herbert Standing Jr. and Percy Standing. He was also the uncle of Joan Standing and Kay Hammond,. and actor Charles Wyndham was his uncle.

Career
Standing, a popular leading man in the silent film era, appeared in more than 130 films between 1915 and 1948. He and Ronald Colman starred in the original classic The Dark Angel (1925), a film once lost but recently rediscovered. He delivered a memorable performance in Hell's Angels (1930) as the commanding officer who gets fed up with the cowardly antics of Ben Lyon and James Hall before sending them off on a deadly bombing mission.

Filmography

 Business Is Business (1915) - Marquis
 A Mother's Atonement (1915, Short) - Wilbur Kent
 The Supreme Test (1915) - James Semple
 Bullets and Brown Eyes (1916) - Count Michael
 The Bugle Call (1916) - Capt. William Andrews
 The Beggar of Cawnpore (1916) - Capt. Guy Douglas
 The Wolf Woman (1916) - Franklin Walden
 Redeeming Love (1916) - Hugh Wiley
 The Waiting Soul (1917) - Dudley Kent
 The Auction of Virtue (1917) - Kirke
The Soul of a Magdalen (1917) - Leland Norton
 The Law of the Land (1917) - Richard Harding
 To the Death (1917) - Jules Lavinne
 The Silence Sellers (1917) - Von Kolnitz
 Exile (1917) - Vincento Perez
 Rose of the World (1918) - Captain Harry English
 The Hillcrest Mystery (1918) - Hugo Smith
 The Life Mask (1918) - Woodruffe Clay
 The Glorious Adventure (1918) - Hiram A. Ward
 Out of the Shadow (1919) - Richard Steel
 The Woman on the Index (1919) - David Maber
 Paid in Full (1919) - Jimsy Smith
 The Marriage Price (1919) - Frederick Lawton
 Eyes of the Soul (1919) - Larry Gibson
 The Hushed Hour (1919) - Lord George Daw
 The Witness for the Defense (1919) - Henry Thresk
 A Temperamental Wife (1919) - Senator Newton
 The Isle of Conquest (1919) - John Arnold
 The Miracle of Love (1919) - Clive Herbert
 My Lady's Garter (1920) - Bruce Calhoun
 A Modern Salome (1920) - Harry Torrence
 Lifting Shadows (1920) - Hugh Mason
 Earthbound (1920) - Richard Desborough
 Blackmail (1920) - Richard Harding
 The Marriage of William Ashe (1921) - William Ashe
 The Journey's End (1921) - The Mill Owner
 The Iron Trail (1921) - Murray O'Neil
 The Bride's Play (1922) - Sir Fergus Cassidy
 Smilin' Through (1922) - John Carteret
 Isle of Doubt (1922) - Dean Deland
 The Inner Man (1922) - Thurlow Michael Barclay Jr
 The Hypocrites (1923) - Rev, Edgar Linnell
 The Lion's Mouse (1923) - Dick Sands
 Little Johnny Jones (1923) - The Earl of Bloomsburg
 Daytime Wives (1923) - Elwood adams
 Forgive and Forget (1923) - Mr. Cameron
 The Gold Diggers (1923) - Stephen Lee
 Secrets (1924) - Minor Role (uncredited)
 Pagan Passions (1924) - John Dangerfield
 The Rejected Woman (1924) - James Dunbar
 Vanity's Price (1924) - Richard Dowling
 Flames of Desire (1924) - Daniel Strathmore
 The Early Bird (1925) - George Fairchild
 The Reckless Sex (1925) - Carter Trevor
 The Teaser (1925) - Jeffry Loring
 The Dark Angel (1925) - Gerald Shannon
 Soiled (1925) - James P. Munson
 The Unchastened Woman (1925) - Hubert Knollys
 If Youth But Knew (1926) - Sir Ormsby Ledger
 The Canadian (1926) - Ed Marsh
 White Heat (1927) - Gilbert Gillman
 Thumbs Down (1927) - James Breen
 The City Gone Wild (1927) - Franklin Ames
 The Port of Missing Girls (1928) - Mayor McKibben
 The Price of Divorce (1928) - The Doctor
 The Flying Squad (1929) - Mark McGill
 Power Over Men (1929) - Émile Delacour
 Widecombe Fair (1929) - The Squire
 Hell's Angels (1930) - RFC Squadron Commander
 Such Is the Law (1930) - John W. Tunston
 Dracula (1931) - Surgeon (uncredited)
The Silent Witness (1932) - Sir John Lawson--Barrister
 A Study in Scarlet (1933) - Capt. Pyke
 Design for Living (1933) - Max's Butler
 Sadie McKee (1934) - Alderson's Butler (uncredited)
 The Key (1934) - Officer (uncredited)
 The Girl from Missouri (1934) - Turner's Butler (uncredited)
 You Belong to Me (1934) - Magician (uncredited)
 British Agent (1934) - Englishman Talking to Carrister at Party (uncredited)
 Imitation of Life (1934) - Jarvis the Butler
 Limehouse Blues (1934) - Assistant Commissioner Kenyon
 Clive of India (1935) - Col. Townsend (uncredited)
 East of Java (1935) - Hunter (uncredited)
 Mary of Scotland (1936) - Sergeant-at-Arms
 Beloved Enemy (1936) - Thornton
 Law of the Underworld (1938) - Businessman at Meeting (uncredited)
 Kidnapped (1938) - Clansman (uncredited)
 Bulldog Drummond's Secret Police (1939) - Wedding Master of Ceremonies (uncredited)
 The Man in the Iron Mask (1939) - Doctor
 Bulldog Drummond's Bride (1939) - Ambulance Doctor (uncredited)
 They Shall Have Music (1939) - Minor Role (uncredited)
 Mr. Smith Goes to Washington (1939) -  Senator Ashman (uncredited)
 Rulers of the Sea (1939) - Banker (uncredited)
 The Amazing Mr. Williams (1939) - Elevator Passenger (uncredited)
 The Night of Nights (1939) - Naval Commander (uncredited)
 Waterloo Bridge (1940) - Toff (uncredited)
 Escape to Glory (1940) - Man
 Pride and Prejudice (1940) - Committeeman (uncredited)
 The Long Voyage Home (1940) - British Naval Officer (uncredited)
 The Son of Monte Cristo (1940) - Chamberlain
 Free and Easy (1941) - Lord Wensley (uncredited)
 Rage in Heaven (1941) - Dr. McTernan (scenes deleted)
 Meet John Doe (1941) - Democrat (uncredited)
 They Dare Not Love (1941) - Cafe Patron (uncredited)
 International Lady (1941) - Minor Role (uncredited)
 Smilin' Through (1941) - Doctor (uncredited)
 This Above All (1942) - Doctor (uncredited)
 They All Kissed the Bride (1942) - Department Head (uncredited)
 Counter-Espionage (1942) - The Maitre d' (uncredited)
 Laugh Your Blues Away (1942) - Mr. Jamison
 Appointment in Berlin (1943) - Bartender (uncredited)
 Madame Curie (1943) - King Oscar (uncredited)
 A Guy Named Joe (1943) - English Colonel (uncredited)
 Passport to Destiny (1944) - Doctor (uncredited)
 Meet the People (1944) - Shipyard Executive (uncredited)
 Marriage Is a Private Affair (1944) - Butler (uncredited)
 Mrs. Parkington (1944) - Butler (uncredited)
 The Woman in the Window (1944) - Man at Club (uncredited)
 The Great John L. (1945) - (uncredited)
 Week-End at the Waldorf (1945) - Literary Type (uncredited)
 The Locket (1946) - Butler (uncredited)
 The Secret Heart (1946) - Butler (uncredited)
 The Sea of Grass (1947) - Gambler (uncredited)
 The Arnelo Affair (1947) - Member (uncredited)
 The Late George Apley (1947) - Trustee, Boston Waif Society (uncredited)
 The Private Affairs of Bel Ami (1947) - Count de Vaudrec
 Ivy (1947) - Assistant Chief Justice (uncredited)
 Lured (1947) - Asst. Medical Examiner (uncredited)
 Merton of the Movies (1947) - Club Member (uncredited)
 Green Dolphin Street (1947) - Government General (uncredited)
 If Winter Comes (1947) - London Doctor (uncredited)
 B.F.'s Daughter (1948) - F.W. White, Ainsley's Friend

References

External links

1880 births
1963 deaths
English male film actors
English male silent film actors
Male actors from London
20th-century English male actors
Standing family
British expatriate male actors in the United States